is Tohoshinki's 25th Japanese single, released on January 21, 2009. Bolero was the theme song for the Japanese movie, "Subaru (昴)". The movie is named after the ballerina lead named Subaru, which released on March 20, 2009. Tohoshinki made their debut screen on Subaru. The members of Tohoshinki appeared in one scene in which Meisa Kuroki’s character visited a bar; where they performed on a stage during the scene.

By the beginning of February, the single was announced to receive Platinum Disc Certificate by Japan Association of Records on February 10, 2009 for reaching 101,861 in sales.

Track listing

CD
 "Bolero"
 "Kiss the Baby Sky"
 "Wasurenaide"
 "Dōshite Kimi o Suki ni Natte Shimattandarō?" (Royal Mirrorball Mix) (CD Version Only)
 "Bolero" (Less Vocal)
 "Kiss the Baby Sky" (Less Vocal)
 "Wasurenaide" (Less Vocal)

DVD
 "Bolero" (Video clip)
 Off Shot Movie

Charts

Oricon sales chart (Japan)

References

External links
 https://web.archive.org/web/20080409203505/http://toho-jp.net/index.html

2009 singles
TVXQ songs
Oricon Weekly number-one singles
Rhythm Zone singles
Japanese film songs